Unguis odoratus (also called ’blattes de Byzance’ and ‘sweet hoof’) is a nail-like sweet marine shell which was a medicine "famous among the ancients, and used in considerable Quantity".

Unguis odoratus is a fragrant material consisting of the opercula of certain marine snails. Ancient texts refer to Unguis odoratus as the shell or scale of snails from the Red Sea that emit a pleasant smell when burned.

With its marine origins ‘sweet hoof’ is intrinsically linked to the ocean and to trade, and it has also long been of importance from the Mediterranean to China and Japan. It is probably the most ancient animal derived aromatic to have an extensive global use, being mentioned in ancient Babylonian incense recipes.

Source  

Incense material
Gastropods and humans
Perfumes